Run and gun may refer to:

 Run and gun video game, a sub-genre of shoot 'em up video games
 Run&Gun, a Japanese boy band and performance troupe
 Run and gun (basketball), a style of play in basketball
 Another name for the run and shoot offense, an offensive system in American football
 Run and Gun, a 1993 basketball video game released by Konami in 1993
 Run and Gun II, the 1996 sequel